Builum Khawhlui is a village in Kolasib district of Mizoram state of India.

References

Villages in Kolasib district